Queen Victoria's Bomb is a steampunk novel by Ronald W. Clark, published in 1967. Its plot surrounds the invention of a nuclear weapon in the Victorian era which might be used to win the Crimean War.

See also

Anti-Ice
To Visit the Queen

References 

1967 British novels
British alternative history novels
British steampunk novels
Novels set during the Crimean War
Jonathan Cape books